Anisotes diversifolius is a species of plant in the family Acanthaceae. It is endemic to Yemen. Its natural habitats are subtropical or tropical dry forests and rocky areas.

References

Acanthaceae
Endemic flora of Socotra
Least concern plants
Taxonomy articles created by Polbot
Plants described in 1884
Taxa named by Isaac Bayley Balfour